Michaelmas Term is a Jacobean comedy by Thomas Middleton. It was first performed in 1604 by the Children of Paul's, and was entered into the Stationers' Register on 15 May 1607, and published in quarto later that year by Arthur Johnson. A second quarto was printed in 1630 by the bookseller Richard Meighen.

Characters
Richard Easy, a gentleman from Essex
Rearage, Salewood & Cockstone, London gallants
Ephestian Quomodo, a woollen draper
Thomasine, Quomodo's wife
Sim, their son
Susan, their daughter
Shortyard & Falselight, Quomodo's cronies
Boy, Quomodo's servant
Winifred, Thomasine's maid
Andrew Lethe, born Andrew Gruel, a Scottish upstart
Mother Gruel, Lethe's mother
Dick Hellgill (Pander)
Country Wench, also Courtesan and Harlot, Lethe's mistress
Country Wench's Father
Mother, an old woman
Mistress Comings, a tirewoman
Tailor
Judge
Dustbox, a scrivener
Drawer
Mourners
Servants
Officers
Livery
Hospital Boys

Characters in the Induction
Michaelmas Term
Boy, his servant
Hilary, Easter, and Trinity Terms
Poor Fellow, Page, and Pander, in dumb show

Synopsis

Induction

A personification of Michaelmas Term changes out of his white "country" cloak and into his black "city cloak" (the devil's favorite color). His servant (a "boy") tells him that several country litigants are on their way to London, planning to use their profits from the harvest to finance lawsuits. Figures representing the other three terms (Trinity, Hilary and Easter) enter, leading a "poor" man who is made "rich" as they present him with rich apparel, a page and a pander. The three terms greet Michaelmas and tell him that several more fools are on their way. They express hope that he will spread the wealth around. Michaelmas promises them that there will be lawsuits enough to last for the next four years.

Act I

Scene 1: The middle aisle in St Paul's Cathedral

Masters Rearage and Salewood, two London gallants, meet each other at St. Paul's. Master Cockstone, a gentleman, enters with Master Easy, a landowner from Essex (a rural county Northeast of London whose farmers had a reputation for gullibility). Easy has come to London because his Father has recently died.

Cockstone takes Rearage aside and tells him that Easy is gullible and a poor judge of character – a "fresh" lad who "wants the city powd"ring". Cockstone asks Rearage how the prospective match between himself and Master Quomodo's daughter is going (Master Quomodo is a rich cloth merchant). Rearage tells him that he faces fierce competition from a rival suitor, Andrew Lethe, an upstart adventurer from Scotland who has recently become very rich in London. Quomodo's wife still prefers Rearage for a son-in-law, but Quomodo favors Lethe, and has ordered Rearage to stay away from his house.

Quomodo enters with his two accomplices, Shortyard (a colloquialism for "small penis") and Falselight. Quomodo orders Shortyard to befriend and corrupt Easy, driving him into Quomodo's debt so Quomodo can cheat him out of his land. Shortyard says he is the perfect man for the job, and exits.

Andrew Lethe enters. Rearage tells Salewood that Lethe (known for his impudence, forgetfulness, lust, falsehood and lack of wit) is his rival, the suitor whom Master Quomodo prefers. Rearage and Salewood greet Lethe warmly. Lethe apologizes for not recognizing them, noting that he has been introduced to so many people lately, and has received so many gifts, that he has trouble remembering all the people he is supposed to know. He invites all of the gentlemen present to a venison dinner that evening. They accept the invitation. Everyone except Lethe exits.

Lethe notes that his project to marry Quomodo's daughter is going well except for one problem: Quomodo's wife hates him. He wonders aloud why she should despise him so much – he has enough money to provide her daughter with the finest possible husband. He reads out a letter he has composed for Mistress Quomodo. In the letter, he says that the only imaginable explanation for her refusal to admit him as a son-in-law must be that she is, in fact, in love with him herself; if this is the case, he says, she need not worry; if he is permitted to marry her daughter, they will have plenty of opportunities to meet and make love without arousing suspicion. Lethe wonders aloud who he can get to deliver the letter for him – his page has been sent out on another errand and his pander has been sent to the country to find women.

Lethe's mother, Mother Gruel, enters. Lethe does not want to be seen talking to her because he wishes to disassociate himself from his former poverty in Scotland. Failing to recognize her own son, Mother Gruel asks Lethe if he has seen an "Andrew Gruel" (Lethe's former name), her son; his father has died and she has no one to look after her. Lethe decides to hire his mother as his "drudge".

Scene 2: A street in London

Lethe's pander, Hellgill, has brought a "Country Wench" to the city to be Lethe's whore. He promises her that life as a city prostitute will far surpass her former life as a country maid. The wench admits that she is unable to resist the allure of luxuries, such as satin gowns.

Act II

Scene 1: A room in a tavern. Rearage, Salewood, Lethe, Easy and Shortyard are playing dice

Shortyard introduces himself to Easy as "Blastfield". He claims to be a friend of Master Alsup (an acquaintance of Easy's from Essex), and says that, because Easy is a friend of Alsup's, he will not want for money for as long as he is in London. "Blastfield" encourages Easy to drink and gamble. Easy continues gambling, and eventually loses all of his money to Lethe, who is on a winning streak. "Blastfield" sends a servant to borrow money from Quomodo.

Easy seems very impressionable and is obviously attracted to the idea of becoming a gentleman. He decides to give up dice forever because of his loss, but quickly retracts the decision when "Blastfield" tells him it would be ungentlemanly.

Hellgill arrives and tells Lethe about the girl he has brought from the country. "Blastfield's" servant returns to report that Master Quomodo will lend Blastfield whatever money he may need. Lethe gives Hellgill a jewel to present to the Country Wench. The gentlemen all agree to meet again the following night.

Scene 2: A street in the Holborn district of London

The Country Wench's father has come to London to find his daughter. He says he knows the "man-devouring city" quite well because he "wasted his name and state" in London when he was young.

Scene 3: Quomodo's shop in London

Mother Gruel enters to give the letter from Lethe to Quomodo's wife, Thomasine. Thomasine is offended by the letter because Lethe has offered to love her only "for a need" (i.e., in an emergency). Thomasine instructs Mother Gruel to tell Lethe that he is not worthy to marry her daughter. Mother Gruel exits.

Quomodo enters with his daughter, Susan. Quomodo says that Lethe would be a good husband for their daughter because he is rich. Susan says that she likes Rearage much better because he is a gentleman. Quomodo insists that Susan's "likings" are irrelevant. Thomasine argues that Rearage is a much better match because he is a landowner, and collects rent from his lands.

Falselight enters and tells Quomodo that Rearage will soon arrive with Easy. Quomodo sends his wife and daughter away so he can talk business. Thomasine says she will watch the meeting from the courtyard above. Quomodo eagerly anticipates cheating Easy out of his land.

Easy and "Blastfield" (Shortyard) arrive to borrow money from Quomodo. Quomodo tells them that he cannot lend them any cash at the moment because his funds are tied up in other loans, which remain unpaid. This news worries Easy; he does not have any money and he has invited the gentlemen to dinner that evening. Quomodo suggest a solution: Instead of cash, he will loan them two hundred pounds worth of cloth, which he says they will be able to sell to any merchant in town. (Falstaff pulls a scam similar to this in Henry IV, part 2). Watching the swindle from the balcony above, Thomasine notes Quomodo's cruelty and expresses sympathy for the gullible Easy. She compares the dealings to an execution.

Quomodo sends for a scrivener to draw up a contract for the loan. The debt is, in fact, "Blastfield's", but "Blastfield" asks Easy to sign the contract as well because Quomodo insists on a guarantor. Falselight (posing as a servant) is sent out to find merchants who might want to purchase the fabric. He returns not long thereafter to report that, because the passage route across the English Channel is blocked, none of the cloth merchants in town are willing to make any new purchases. Quomodo says he knows of another merchant, "Master Idem", who has recently set up in business and might be willing to purchase the cloth. The only problem, he says, is that the might have to sell the cloth at a loss. Easy says that he would be willing take as little as 80 pounds – all he really needs at present is enough money to pay for the dinner (Quomodo has promised to lend them 300 pounds in four or five days time). Falselight is sent to summon Master Idem to come look at the cloth.

Thomasine enters. Easy greets her politely. She is impressed by his manners. She introduces her son, Sim, a student who has just returned from Cambridge and spouts awkward Latin (compare with Tim Yellowhammer from A Chaste Maid in Cheapside.) Falselight enters, disguised as "Master Idem", and offers 60 pounds for the cloth. Easy agrees to the deal.

Act III

Scene 1: The Country Wench's lodging in London

The Country Wench is dressed up as a gentlewoman. A tailor and a tirewoman (hairdresser), Mistress Comings, help her get ready. Hellgill says that the Wench's transformation is "glorious." The country wench asks Hellgill if he has managed to find a servant for her yet. Hellgill says he thinks he has, and introduces the Country Wench's father (in disguise). Neither father nor daughter recognize each other; they agree to a one-month trial employment.

Rearage and Salewood enter to check out the Country Wench. They deliberately infuriate Lethe by openly courting her. Lethe does his best to disguise his anger. The Country Wench's father observes the scene with disapproval. Easy enters with Shortyard (pretending to be "Blastfield"). Shortyard/"Blastfield" notes that "we" (by which he means himself and Easy, even though the debt is supposed to be his alone) "now owe Quomodo 700 pounds. Lethe greets "Blastfield" and Easy and complains about the way that Shorthand and Rearage are carrying on with the Wench. As soon as they see her, Shortyard and Easy lavish attention on the Wench as well. The Wench eventually pushes them all off.

Mother Gruel arrives with some wine. Lethe tells the men about the letter he has sent to Mistress Quomodo and asks Mother Gruel what Thomasine's reply was. Mother Gruel tells him – in front of everyone – that Thomasine calls him a base, proud knave who has no hope of marrying Susan. Everyone exits except the Country Wench and her father. The Country Wench is upset to hear that Lethe is contemplating marriage. She exits. The Country Wench's father delivers a short speech on the cruelty and folly of prostitution.

Scene 2: A street in London near St. Paul's

Shortyard, a Yeoman and Falselight (disguised as a Sergeant) enter and arrest Easy for unpaid debts. The "sergeant" tells Easy that he must find someone to pay his bail or go to prison. Easy says the only people in London he knows who he could apply to for help are "Blastfield" and Quomodo.

Scene 4: Quomodo's shop

Shortyard's servant tells Quomodo that Shortyard and Falselight will bring Easy to the shop soon. Quomodo looks forward to cheating Easy out of his land. Shortyard and Falselight, disguised as "sergeant" and "Yeoman", lead Easy in. Quomodo tells Easy that, since the debts are due and "Blastfield" cannot be found, Easy is responsible for the 700 pound debt, and must pay immediately or be sent to prison. Easy protests that the debt is, in fact, Blastfield's, not his – and Blastfield will surely be along soon to pay the debt. Quomodo insists that Easy must pay the debt. Feigning sympathy for Easy, the "sergeant" offers to summon two wealthy citizens, philanthropists who are known for arranging bail for noblemen. Easy thanks them for the favor. The "sergeant" and "Yeoman" exit to summon the citizens, leaving Easy as Quomodo's prisoner. Quomodo lectures Easy on the necessity of paying debts. Thomasine watches in disgust.

Falselight and Shortyard re-enter, disguised as wealthy citizens in silk suits. "Blastfield's" servant enters with "good news" for Easy; "Blastfield" has received 1000 pounds and will meet Easy for dinner that evening. Relieved by this news, and confident that the debt will soon be repaid, Easy enters into a bond with the "citizens", putting his lands up as collateral; the citizens, in turn, settle the debt with Quomodo. The "citizens" and Easy hurry off to find "Blastfield" so that the citizens" loan can be immediately repaid.

Scene 5: A London street

Rearage tells Salewood about a letter he plans to send to Quomodo, which discloses all the details of Lethe's various lecheries. Easy enters with a "wealthy citizen" (Shortyard), looking for "Blastfield" (Shortyard). Rearage and Salewood tell Easy that "Blastfield" has not been seen for two days. Lethe enters; he tells Easy that he has not seen "Blastfield" for two days. Easy begins to fear that he will be undone.

Act IV

Scene 1: Quomodo's shop

Easy enters with Shortyard and Falselight, who are disguised as wealthy citizens. Because "Blastfield" cannot be found, the "citizens" and Quomodo say that the debt will have to be settled by signing Easy's lands over to Quomodo. Easy curses Quomodo and exits.

Worried about what might become of his new lands after he dies, Quomodo lays a plan to leave everything to his son, then fake his own death so that he can watch the reaction to his death—how much his wife will pay for his funeral, whether Shortyard and Falselight will attempt to usurp his son's inheritance, etc.

Scene 2: The Country Wench's lodging in London

The Country Wench's father scolds his daughter (though he does not realize she is his daughter); he thought she was an upright gentlewoman, but she has turned out to be a "wicked bawd". The Country Wench responds that prostitution is just another trade, like any other, and all gentlewomen are sinners, one way or another.

Scene 3: Outside Quomodo's shop

Quomodo is pronounced dead (he has made arrangements to procure a falsified death certificate). Shortyard immediately begins to lay plans to cheat Quomodo's son out of his inheritance. Secretly thrilled by the news of her husband's death, Thomasine instructs her maid, Winnifred, to anonymously deliver a letter and a ring to Master Easy's lodgings (she has apparently sent Easy some money as well). Rearage enters. Thomasine tells him that, in truth, she is not very upset about her husband's death because he treated her terribly. Rearage says that he doesn't blame her. Thomasine says that, now that Quomodo is gone, Rearage will be able to "tread over" Lethe and marry her daughter.

Scene 4: Outside Quomodo's shop

Disguised as a beadle, Quomodo marvels at the extravagancies of the funeral his wife has arranged (she has hired several "counterfeit" mourners). He begins to worry that, by faking his death, he may have caused his wife too much grief, which might kill her.

Eavesdropping on the conversations of liverymen in the funeral procession, Quomodo discovers that people don't have very many good things to say about him. He extends his condolences to his son, Sim, who brushes him off, insisting that his father was a "lewd fellow" – not "honest" at all. Quomodo is shocked to hear his son's true opinion of him. Sim adds that he is glad that his father is dead because he is now rich. He also mentions that he has made Shortyard the rent-gatherer for his new lands. Shocked and enraged, Quomodo vows to disinherit his "most neglectful son". Thomasine enters with several mourners (all counterfeit). Easy enters close behind. Thomasine makes a great show of grief and pretends to swoon. Satisfied with his wife's emotional display, Quomodo exits, following the funeral procession. Left alone with each other, Thomasine and Easy declare their love for each other and make plans to get married.

Act V

Scene 1: Quomodo's shop

Shortyard enters with Quomodo's legal papers, which he has acquired by cheating Sim out of his entire inheritance. The legal papers include the conveyance on Easy's property to the "citizens" (subsequently transferred to Quomodo and Sim) as well as the preliminary bonds made by "Blastfield" and Easy.

Thomasine and Easy enter, now married. Easy accuses Shortyard (whom he sarcastically refers to as "Blastfiled") of swindling him out of his lands (Thomasine has apparently informed him of all details of Quomodo's scheme). He threatens to haul Shortyard before the courts and have his ears cut off (a common punishment). Shortyard defends himself by saying he has cheated Sim Quomodo in order to help Easy reclaim his lands. He offers Easy all of Quomodo's papers. Easy takes the papers, but says that he still intends to have his revenge. He orders a pair Officers to arrest Shortyard. The Officers arrest Shortyard and carry him off.

Quomodo enters. He does not realize that his wife has remarried, and is still under the impression that she is profoundly grieved by his death. Still disguised as a Beadle, he approaches Thomasine to request payment for his services at the funeral. Thomasine pays him and has him sign a memorandum certifying that he has been paid all that he is owed. To surprise his wife and reveal his true identity, he signs his real name, "Ephestian Quomodo" to the memorandum. (The memorandum states that Easy no longer owes Quomodo anything).

Easy enters. When Quomodo hears Easy and Thomasine referring to each other as "husband" and "wife", he goes berserk and reveals his true identity. Thomasine receives him coolly, and denies that he is actually her husband. Quomodo storms out, threatening to bring the matter before a judge.

Scene 2: A London street

Lethe has been caught with a harlot and arrested by two officers. He begs them to take a bribe and let him free because it is his wedding day (a lie). Rearage and Susan (Quomodo's daughter) watch as Lethe is carried off. Susan says it is now obvious that Lethe is a "base slave" while Rearage is a "true gentleman". They plan to get married immediately.

Scene 3: A judge's house

Easy and Thomasine talk with the judge. Two officers hold Shortyard and Falselight in custody. Easy tells the judge that the plaintiff (Quomodo) is an odious schemer, one way or the other – they cannot even be sure if he is the real Quomodo, and if he is, then he is guilty of an outrageous deception. Quomodo insists that he is Quomodo, that Thomasine is his wife and that Shortyard and Falselight are wrongfully bound. To see if he is the real Quomodo, the judge asks Quomodo if he is an infamous cheater; Quomodo says he is not. The judge asks if he is the man who cheated Easy out of his lands; Quomodo says he is not. The judge says that, if these answers are true, then he cannot be the real Quomodo, and must be whipped as a counterfeit. To avoid a whipping, Quomodo admits that he cheated Easy out of his lands. Satisfied with this confession, the judge decides that he must be the real Quomodo.

Quomodo believes that he will still be able to get away with Easy's lands now that his identity has been re-established. This hope is quickly dashed: Easy produces the memorandum with Quomodo's signature, which certifies that he no longer owes Quomodo anything. Shortyard tells how he cheated Sim out of his entire inheritance and transferred all of Quomodo's legal documents back to Easy.

Officers bring in Lethe and the Harlot, followed by Rearage and Susan. The officer tells the judge that Lethe has been caught with a Harlot – on the day of his wedding!  The judge says that, if he prefers his Harlot to his wife, then he ought to marry the Harlot. The Country Wench interjects to say that Lethe has vowed to marry her (a lie). In order to deflect blame for pandering from himself, Hellgill backs up the Wench's story, and adds a few details of his own. He says that Lethe promised to marry the Country Wench before seducing her, but changed his mind afterward. The judge decides to punish Lethe and force him to marry the Country Wench. Lethe protests that he has a prospective bride – Susan Quomodo – already waiting for him. Salewood reveals that this is a lie by announcing that Susan and Rearage have recently been married.

Lethe reveals himself to his mother and begs for her forgiveness. Mother Gruel is amazed at how thoroughly the city has corrupted her son. The judge rules that the ruined Quomodo is his "own affliction," and does not need to be punished any further; Shortyard and Falselight are banished forever.

References

Bibliography
 Middleton, Thomas: Michaelmas Term, ed. by Gail Kern Paster; 2000, Manchester University Press and Room 400.

External links
 The Play text online.

English Renaissance plays
Michaelman Term
1604 in England
Plays by Thomas Middleton